The AJS S3 V-twin is a British motorcycle designed and built by the  Wolverhampton, England company A. J. Stevens & Co. Ltd. Launched in 1931, the AJS S3 was  a 496 cc transverse V-twin tourer with shaft primary drive (but chain final drive), three-speed bevel-driven gearbox and alloy cylinder heads. The 50 degree V configuration was effective for air cooling and with a tank top 'dashboard' was conceived as a luxury cruiser. It had been expensive to develop and at £65 was more expensive than the  AJS of the same year, so the S3 did not sell in large numbers, and by the end of 1931 AJS had gone into liquidation and been taken over by Matchless motorcycles who discontinued production.

See also
 List of motorcycles of the 1930s

References

External links
 AJS S3

S3 V-twin
Motorcycles introduced in the 1930s